Berenicidae or Berenikidai was a deme of ancient Attica, of the phyle of Ptolemais, sending one delegate to the Athenian Boule. It was established in 224/3 BCE and named after Berenice II of Egypt.

Its site is unlocated, but probably near Eleusis as inscriptions referring to the place have been found in the vicinity.

References

Populated places in ancient Attica
Former populated places in Greece
Demoi
Lost ancient cities and towns
200s BC establishments